Erick Guillermo Delgado Vásquez (born 30 June 1982) is a professional Peruvian footballer. He currently plays for Academia Deportiva Cantolao in the Torneo Descentralizado, as a goalkeeper.

Club career 
Delgado began his career with Sporting Cristal, being promoted to the senior side in 2001. In his first seven years with the club, he played 219 league matches in the Torneo Descentralizado, before and transferring to Juan Aurich in January 2009.

Delgado returned to Sporting Cristal in January 2010.

International career
Delgado has made 14 appearances for the Peru national football team.

Personal 
In 2007, he suffered burns on the soles of his feet after playing on artificial turf or artificial pitch in blazing sun.

Honours
Sporting Cristal
 Torneo Descentralizado (3): 2002, 2005, 2012
Apertura : 2003
Clausura : 2004, 2005

References

External links
 
 

1982 births
Living people
Footballers from Lima
Association football goalkeepers
Peruvian footballers
Peru international footballers
2004 Copa América players
Peruvian Primera División players
Sporting Cristal footballers
Juan Aurich footballers
Deportivo Municipal footballers
Club Deportivo Universidad de San Martín de Porres players
Universidad Técnica de Cajamarca footballers
Academia Deportiva Cantolao players